The Serbia team for EuroBasket 2022 qualification represents Serbia at the EuroBasket 2022 qualification. The team was coached by Igor Kokoškov, with assistant coaches Dejan Milojević, Vladimir Jovanović, and Jovica Antonić.

The qualification tournament was largely affected by COVID-19 pandemic in Europe. Due to the pandemic Serbia roster played only one game in Belgrade. The team finished the qualification with the first place in Group E with a 4–2 record.

Background 

As a participant in the second round of the 2019 FIBA Basketball World Cup qualification, Serbia was qualified for the second stage of the EuroBasket 2022 qualification.

The EuroBasket 2022 was originally scheduled to take place in 2021, but due to the COVID-19 pandemic and the subsequent postponement of the 2020 Summer Olympics to 2021, it has been postponed to 2022.

Timeline
 27 January 2020: Coaching and team staff announced
 11 February 2020: 15-man first window roster announced
 20–23 February 2020: The first window
 22 June 2020: Training camp roster announced
 24 June 2020: Players gathering in Belgrade
 25 June – 5 July 2020: Training camp at Kopaonik
 6 November 2020: 20-man second window roster announced
 28–30 November 2020: The second window
 12 February 2021: 16-man second window roster announced
 18–21 February 2021: The third window

Roster
Center Miroslav Raduljica and forward Marko Simonović are the only members of Serbia roster at the 2019 FIBA Basketball World Cup included into the February roster. On 17 February, guard Luka Ašćerić was added to the roster due to an injury of the guard Ognjen Dobrić. Even he was shortlisted, guard Miloš Teodosić wasn't added to the roster due to a demand of his club Virtus Bologna. Guards Nikola Rebić and Uroš Trifunović, forwards Dalibor Ilić and Stefan Đorđević, and center Dejan Kravić made their senior debut with the Serbian national team.

In June 2020, forward Milan Mačvan, a team captain at EuroBasket 2017, announced his retirement from his basketball career at age 31.

Guards Ašćerić, Dobrić, Teodosić, Ognjen Jaramaz, forwards Novica Veličković and Dejan Todorović, and center Raduljica were unlisted, while eleven new players were called in. Forward Simonović was selected as the new team captain due to Raduljica's inability to play on the second window. Guard Danilo Anđušić make the first appearance with the national team since the EuroBasket 2013, while forward Nemanja Dangubić previously played at the 2016 FIBA World Olympic Qualifying Tournament. On 23 November, Kokoškov selected a 14-man roster, cutting guards Rebić, Nikola Radičević, Trifunović, Stefan Momirov and centers Filip Petrušev and Đorđević from the 20-man roster. Guards Stefan Pot and Marko Jeremić, forward Boriša Simanić, and center Dragan Apić made their senior debut with the Serbian national team.

Guards Pot, Jovan Novak, Stefan Peno, Jeremić, and Aleksa Radanov, forwards Simonović, Simanić and Rade Zagorac, and center Kravić were unlisted, while eleven new players were called in, of whom guards Ašćerić, Jaramaz, and Rebić, and centers Raduljica and Đorđević returned from the first window roster. Guards Vasilije Micić and Marko Gudurić are two new members of the 2019 Serbia FIBA World Cup team included into the third window roster. On 16 February, forward Simanić was re-added to the roster while center Đorđević was cut from the roster. Guards Gudurić and Micić won't be with the squad for the Georgia game due to a schedule conflict with EuroLeague. Afterwards, guards Gudurić and Micić were cut from the roster following the victory over Georgia which resulted the Serbia's qualification for EuroBasket. Forward Marko Luković, and centers Petrušev and Marko Radovanović made their senior debut with the Serbian national team.

The following are all players who appeared at least in one game during the EuroBasket 2022 qualification:

Depth chart

The first window 
The following is the first window depth chart, February 2020.

The second window 
The following is the second window depth chart, November 2020.

The third window 
The following is the third window depth chart, February 2021.

2020 training camp 
On 22 June 2020, head coach Kokoškov announced a 31-man roster for a 10-day training camp at Kopaonik. Center Nikola Janković withdrew after tested positive for SARS-CoV-2, the virus responsible for the COVID-19 pandemic. On the same day, center Stefan Đorđević tested positive for COVID-19. The Basketball Federation of Serbia canceled the training camp following Đorđević testing positive for COVID-19. 

The following was the Serbia roster for the training camp.

Miloš Teodosić
Miroslav Raduljica
Stefan Jović
Vasilije Micić
Nemanja Nedović
Nikola Kalinić
Ognjen Jaramaz
Rade Zagorac
Stefan Birčević
Uroš Trifunović
Nikola Janković
Novica Veličković
Luka Ašćerić
Nikola Rebić
Branko Lazić
Ognjen Dobrić
Dejan Davidovac
Boriša Simanić
Nikola Jovanović
Ognjen Kuzmić
Stefan Đorđević
Stefan Pot
Marko Pecarski
Aleksa Radanov
Marko Radovanović
Aleksa Avramović
Nemanja Dangubić
Luka Mitrović
Dalibor Ilić
Stefan Janković
Aleksej Pokuševski

Notes

Staff 
At the end of the 2019 FIBA Basketball World Cup where Serbia won 5th place, head coach Aleksandar Đorđević announced his decision to leave the position after six years. On 20 November 2019, the Basketball Federation of Serbia named Igor Kokoškov the new head coach of the Serbia team. In December, Dejan Milojević and Vladimir Jovanović were named assistant coaches. On 27 January, coach Kokoškov announced the full staff.

Head coach Kokoškov was not able to lead Serbia on the 19 February game against Georgia due to a schedule conflict with EuroLeague. On the same date Kokoškov will lead Fenerbahçe. Assistant coach Milojević acted as the head coach on the 19 February game.

Age – describes age on 21 February 2021

Source: KSS

Uniform

Supplier: Peak
Main sponsor: Austiger
Back sponsor: Triglav (below number)
Shorts sponsor: mts

Qualification 

The draw was held on 22 July 2019 in Munich, Germany. Serbia was drawn into Group E with Finland, Georgia, and the Pre-Qualifiers Group H winner. These matches will be played in three windows from 17 to 25 February 2020; from 23 November to 1 December 2020 and from 15 to 23 February 2021 with two games played by each team in every window.

Group E is one of eight qualifiers groups of four teams. The groups will be conducted in a round-robin system, with each team playing all other teams in the respective group in home and away games. Georgia as the host and the two other highest placed teams will qualify for the EuroBasket 2021.

On 21 August, Switzerland won Pre-Qualifiers Group H and advance to the next round joining Serbia and others in Group E. On 8 October, FIBA announced the group hosts for November 2020. The Group E held two rounds of the second window in Espoo, Finland. On 4 December, FIBA announced the group hosts for February 2021. The Group E will play two rounds of the third window in Tbilisi, Georgia.

Serbia got qualified for EuroBasket 2022 following the Gameday 5 win over Georgia on 19 February 2021.

Group E

Finland (Away game)

Georgia (Home game)

Switzerland (Away game)

Finland (Home game)

Georgia (Away game) 

Head coach Kokoškov missed the game due to the schedule conflict with EuroLeague. Instead of him, assistant coach Milojević led the team from the bench. Center Filip Petrušev recorded 27 points, 6 rebounds, and two assists on his senior team debut. As a result of the Serbia's victory, they have got qualified for EuroBasket 2022.

Switzerland (Home game)

Awards 
Team of Gamedays

Statistics

Player statistics

Aftermath 

The team finished the qualification with the first place in Group E with a 4–2 record.

The EuroBasket 2022 draw took place on 29 April 2021 in Berlin, Germany. Serbia was drawn into Group D with the Czech Republic, Finland, Israel, Netherlands, and Poland. The games will be played from 2 to 8 September 2022 at the O2 Arena in Prague, Czech Republic.

Four months following the qualification tournament the Serbia roster entered the 2020 FIBA Men's Olympic Qualifying Tournament in Belgrade, Serbia. It was originally scheduled to take place from 23 to 28 June 2020 but was postponed due to the COVID-19 pandemic, to 29 June to 4 July 2021.

See also 
 Italy team for EuroBasket 2021 qualification

References

External links

Serbia Qualifiers Profile at the FIBA Website

2020
EuroBasket 2022
2019–20 in Serbian basketball
2020–21 in Serbian basketball